DreamStar FC Ladies is a women's association football club based in Surulere Lagos State, Nigeria and a member of the Nigerian Women Football League (NWFL). They have competed in the Nigeria Women Premier League, the highest division for women association football in the country, since the 2018/2019 season, having gained promotion to the elite league by winning all their lower division's matches.

Known as Dream Stars Ladies, until April 2020, the DreamStar FC Ladies had the distinction of being the only club-side with clean sheet in the 2nd Division Pro league 2017/2018 season in both Northern and Southern Conferences. DreamStar FC Ladies is the female, and most distinguished professional, squad of Dream Stars Sports Development Organisation, a grassroots soccer development company that provides a total value-chain development programme through its football academy for boys and girls to the professional stage. The Dream Stars Sports Development Organisation, its academy, and clubs were created on the 29th of February 2012 by founder and chairman, AbdulRahmon Abolore.

History
DreamStar FC Ladies played in the Southern Conference of the lower division of NWFL Pro League in the 2017/2018 season, and topped the division, without losing a match. This earned them promotion to the Premier Division of the NWFL for the 2018/2019 season.

The first season in the premiership league was not without its challenges, and despite recording some memorable feats such as scoring the most goals for any debutante side (4-0 against Heartland Queens) in the NWPL history (2nd highest for any club to Bayelsa Queens' 5 – 1 trouncing of Kaduna Queens), and winning the NWFL Goal of the Season Award 2018/2019, scored by defender, Oluwabunmi Oladeji, DreamStar FC Ladies finished at the bottom of the table in their group. To retain their place in the premier league, DreamStar FC Ladies had to engage in play-offs against three other relegation bound clubs from the other three groups. The debutantes (known then as Dream Stars Ladies) edged Invincible Angels 4–2 on penalties after they played out a 1–1 draw in regulation time at the Fifa Goal Project pitch, MKO Stadium, to avoid relegation. The team secured a lead in the 21st minute of the play-off, as Anuoluwapo Salisu’s corner kick found captain Judith Nwaogu, whose header beat the Heartland Queen's goalkeeper. However, the Benue State based side fought back in the second half and levelled matters in the 84th minute through Kafayat Bashiru before full-time, but eventually bowed out in the ensuing penalty kicks.

2019/2020 season
In the 2019/2020 the NWPL changes its 4-group format to 2 groups, to enable higher quality of competition. DreamStar FC Ladies have been drawn into Group A, along with Pelican Stars FC, Nasarawa Amazons FC, Sunshine Stars FC, Bayelsa Queens FC, Abia Angels FC, Confluence Queens FC, and Edo Queens FC. The top two teams from each group will qualify automatically for the Nigeria Women's Super Cup (also known as The Super 4 Championship), while the last teams from the two groups will get relegated to the NWFL - 2nd Division Pro League.

2020/2021 season
The 2020-2021 match fixtures:

Players

2022 League Season

The team list for the 2020-2021 league season is as below:

2019-2020 League Season

The 2019-2020 team list as released by the club's management:

Business Development
DreamStar FC Ladies and their owner, Dream Stars Sports Development Organisation, are not without the usual problem that assails privately owned soccer clubs in Africa - inadequate funding. In order to position the DreamStar FC Ladies as a truly professional club of international standard, the owner has sought the help of a sports development consulting firm to re-vamp its image and build a highly visible brand, with the intent of proving to prospective sponsors and partners that the club is not only serious about remaining in the top-flight soccer arena in Nigeria and Africa, but that it intends to remain one of the best and profitable club-sides. As a kick-off to the 2019–2020 season, the club owners have made two prominent changes.

Apart from listed changes, the club underwent internal process and team management changes that impacts on managing and technical improvement. Other notable improvement initiatives included design of a professional and engaging website, revamping and harmonising the social media pages, organising technical training and skills development for the coaching crew, building team psychology around the vision of the club, and establishing a supporters' club model to foster brand loyalty among Lagos fans.

References

External links
 COVID-19: Dream Stars Ladies Proceed on Break

Association football clubs established in 2012
Football clubs in Lagos
Women's football clubs in Nigeria
NWFL Premiership clubs